Dear Friend: Bakasyonistas is a 2009 Philippine television drama series broadcast by GMA Network. It is the fifth instalment of Dear Friend. Directed by Gil Tejada Jr., it stars Mark Herras, Isabel Oli, Sheena Halili, Rainier Castillo, Chris Cayzer and Ryza Cenon. It premiered on June 14, 2009 and concluded on July 5, 2009.

Premise
Friends Gina, Tracy and Mia plan a vacation getaway to unwind and bond together. Similarly, buddies Aaron, Troy and Alex hit the road to chill, de-stress and have fun. They bump into each other at the same resort and are forced to stay in one rest house. To make matters worse, the six of them have different personalities and individual inhibitions with their new set of friends.

Cast and characters

 Mark Herras as Alex
 Isabel Oli as Gina
 Sheena Halili as Tracy
 Rainier Castillo as Aaron
 Chris Cayzer as Troy
 Ryza Cenon as Mia
 Prince Stefan as Joey

References

2009 Philippine television series debuts
2009 Philippine television series endings
Filipino-language television shows
GMA Network drama series
Television shows set in the Philippines